Major-General Jack Bertie Dye,  (13 December 1919 – 10 June 2013) was a British Army officer.

Military career
Dye was commissioned into the Royal Norfolk Regiment on 13 September 1940. He took part in the Normandy landings in June 1944 during the Second World War. He became commanding officer of the 1st East Anglian Regiment in 1963 and fought against insurgents in Aden in May and June 1964 during the Aden Emergency and, following amalgamation, took command of new 1st Battalion, the Royal Anglian Regiment in September 1964.

He then became commander of the South Arabian Federation's Regular Army in 1966. He went on to be General Officer Commanding Eastern District in February 1969 and Director-General, Territorial Army in March 1971 before retiring in May 1974.

Family
In 1942, he married Jean Prall; they had two daughters.

References

|-

1914 births
1995 deaths
British Army major generals
Commanders of the Order of the British Empire
Recipients of the Military Cross
Royal Norfolk Regiment officers
British Army personnel of World War II
People from Great Yarmouth
Royal Anglian Regiment officers
British military personnel of the Aden Emergency
Military personnel from Norfolk